Johnny Nielsen (born 2 March 1941) is a Danish wrestler. He competed in the men's Greco-Roman 57 kg at the 1968 Summer Olympics.

References

External links
 

1941 births
Living people
Danish male sport wrestlers
Olympic wrestlers of Denmark
Wrestlers at the 1968 Summer Olympics
Sportspeople from Copenhagen